Balian of Ibelin, also known as Barisan the Younger, was a crusader noble of the Kingdom of Jerusalem in the 12th century.  He was lord of Ibelin from 1170 to 1193. As the leader of the defense of the city during the siege of Jerusalem in 1187, he surrendered Jerusalem to Saladin on 2 October 1187.

Early years 

Balian was the youngest son of Barisan of Ibelin, and brother of Hugh and Baldwin. His father, a knight in the County of Jaffa, had been rewarded with the lordship of Ibelin after the revolt of Hugh II of Le Puiset. Barisan married Helvis of Ramla, heiress of the wealthy lordship of Ramla. Balian's name was also Barisan, but he seems to have adapted the name to the Old French "Balian" c. 1175–76; he is sometimes known as Balian the Younger or Balian II when his father is also referred to as Balian. He is also called Balian of Ramla or Balian of Nablus. In Latin his name appears variously as Balian, Barisan, Barisanus, Balianus, Balisan, and Balisanus. Arabic sources call him Balian ibn Barzan which translates "Balian, son of Barzan."

His precise year of birth is unknown, but he was of the age of majority (usually 15) by 1158, when he first appears in charters, having been described as under-age ("infra annos") in 1156.

After the death of Balian's eldest brother Hugh c. 1169, the castle of Ibelin passed to the next brother, Baldwin. Baldwin, preferring to remain lord of Ramla, gave it to Balian. Balian held Ibelin as a vassal of his brother, and indirectly as a rear-vassal of the king, from whom Baldwin held Ramla.

Succession disputes
Baldwin supported Raymond III of Tripoli over Miles of Plancy as regent for King Baldwin IV in 1174, and in 1177 the brothers were present at the Battle of Montgisard, leading the vanguard victoriously against the strongest point of the Muslim line. That year Balian also married Maria Comnena, widow of King Amalric I, becoming stepfather to Amalric's younger daughter Isabella. He received the lordship of Nablus, which had been a dower gift to Maria following her marriage to Amalric. In 1179, Baldwin of Ramla was captured by Saladin after the Battle of Jacob's Ford, and Balian helped arrange for his ransom and release the next year; the ransom was eventually paid by Byzantine emperor Manuel I Comnenus, Maria's great-uncle.

In 1183 Balian and Baldwin supported Raymond against Guy of Lusignan, husband of Amalric's elder daughter Sibylla and by now regent for Baldwin IV, who was dying of leprosy. The king had his 5-year-old nephew Baldwin of Montferrat crowned as co-king in his own lifetime, in an attempt to prevent Guy from ascending. Shortly before his death in spring 1185, Baldwin IV ordered a formal crown-wearing by his nephew at the Church of the Holy Sepulchre. It was Balian himself—a notably tall man—who carried the child Baldwin V on his shoulder at the ceremony, signifying the support of Isabella's family for her nephew. Soon after, the eight-year-old boy became sole king. When he, too, died in 1186, Balian and Maria, with Raymond's support, put forward Maria's daughter Isabella, then about 14, as a candidate for the throne. However, her husband, Humphrey IV of Toron, refused the crown and swore fealty to Guy. Balian reluctantly also paid homage to Guy, while his brother refused to do so and exiled himself to Antioch. Baldwin placed Balian in charge of raising his son Thomas, the future lord of Ramla, who did not go with his father to Antioch.

Dispute between Raymond and Guy
Balian remained in the kingdom, as an advisor to Guy. At the end of 1186, Saladin, the sultan of Egypt and Damascus, threatened the borders of the kingdom after Guy's ally Raynald of Châtillon, Lord of Oultrejordain, had attacked a Muslim caravan. Saladin was allied with the garrison of Tiberias in the north of the kingdom, a territory held by Raymond III. Guy gathered his army at Nazareth, planning to besiege Tiberias, but Balian disagreed with this, and instead suggested that Guy send an emissary to Raymond in Tripoli, hoping the two could be reconciled before Guy made a foolish attack on Saladin's larger army. The first embassy was a failure and the situation remained unchanged throughout the early months of 1187. After Easter of that year, Balian, Gerard of Ridefort (Grand Master of the Knights Templar), Roger de Moulins (Grand Master of the Knights Hospitaller), Reginald of Sidon, and Joscius, Archbishop of Tyre were sent on a new embassy to Tripoli. During the journey they stopped at Balian's fief of Nablus, and Balian planned to remain behind briefly while the others went ahead. On May 1, the Templars and Hospitallers were defeated by Saladin's son al-Afdal at the Battle of Cresson; Balian was still a day behind, and had also stopped at Sebastea to celebrate a feast day. After reaching the castle of La Fève, where the Templars and Hospitallers had camped, he found that the place was deserted, and soon heard news of the disastrous battle from the few survivors. Raymond heard about the battle as well and met the embassy at Tiberias, and agreed to accompany them back to Jerusalem.

The Battle of Hattin
Since al-Afdal's army had been allowed to enter the kingdom through their alliance with Raymond, the count now regretted his actions and reconciled with Guy. Guy marched north and camped at Sephoria, but insisted on marching the army across a dry and barren plain to relieve Tiberias. The army had no water and was constantly harassed by Saladin's troops, and was finally surrounded at the Horns of Hattin outside Tiberias early in July. In the Battle of Hattin that followed on July 4, Balian and Joscelin III of Edessa commanded the rearguard, but the crusader army was completely defeated. The anonymous text, De Expugnatione Terrae Sanctae per Saladinum Libellus claims that Balian, Raymond and Reginald of Sidon fled the field in the middle of the battle, trampling "the Christians, the Turks and the Cross" in the process—but this is not corroborated by other accounts, and likely reflects the author's hostility to the Poleins (a European born in the Levant).

The defeat led to a changing of the guard in Jerusalem: King Guy was taken prisoner, and nearly every town and castle soon fell to Saladin. Balian, Raymond, Reginald, and Payen of Haifa were among the few leading nobles who managed to escape to Tyre. Raymond and Reginald soon left to attend to the defence of their own territories, and Tyre came under the leadership of Conrad of Montferrat, who had arrived not long after Hattin. Balian was to become one of his closest allies. Leaving Tyre, Balian asked Saladin for permission to return through the lines to Jerusalem to escort his wife and their children to Tripoli. Saladin allowed this, provided that Balian leave the city and take an oath to never raise arms against him.

Defense of Jerusalem

When Balian and his small group of knights arrived in the city, the inhabitants begged them to stay, and Balian was absolved of his oath to Saladin by Patriarch Eraclius, who argued that the greater need of Christendom was stronger than his oath to a non-Christian. Balian was recruited to lead the defense of the city, but he found that there were under fourteen, possibly as few as two, other knights there, so he created 60 new knights from the ranks of the burgesses. Queen Sibylla seems to have played little part in the defence, and oaths were taken to Balian as lord. With Eraclius, he prepared for the inevitable siege by storing food and money. Saladin indeed began the siege of Jerusalem on 20 September 1187, after he had conquered almost all of the rest of the kingdom, including Ibelin, Nablus, Ramla, and Ascalon. The sultan felt no ill-will to Balian for breaking his oath, and arranged for an escort to accompany Maria and their children to Tripoli. As the highest ranking lord remaining in Jerusalem, Balian, as Ibn al-Athir wrote, was seen by the Muslims as holding a rank "more or less equal to that of a king."

Saladin was able to knock down portions of the walls, but was unable to gain entrance to the city. Balian then rode out to meet with the sultan, to report to him that the defenders would rather kill each other and destroy the city than see it taken by force. After negotiations, it was decided that the city would be handed over peacefully, and that Saladin would free seven thousand men for 30,000 bezants; two women or ten children would be permitted to take the place of one man for the same price. Balian handed over the keys to the Tower of David (the citadel) on October 2. There was a 50-day period for the payment of ransoms. Those who could not pay for their freedom were forced into slavery; Saladin freed some of them, however, and allowed for an orderly march away from Jerusalem, preventing the sort of massacre that had occurred when the Crusaders captured the city in 1099. Balian and Patriarch Eraclius had offered themselves as hostages for the ransoming of the remaining Frankish citizens, but Saladin had refused. The ransomed inhabitants marched away in three columns. Balian and the Patriarch led the third, which was the last to leave the city, probably around November 20. Balian joined his wife and children in Tripoli.

Balian as king-maker, and the Third Crusade
The fall of Jerusalem, and the death of Sibylla at the Siege of Acre in 1190, led to a dispute over the throne of the kingdom. Balian's stepdaughter Isabella was now rightful queen, but Guy refused to concede his title, and Isabella's husband Humphrey—who had let her cause down in 1186—remained loyal to him. If Isabella were to succeed, she needed a politically acceptable and militarily competent husband, the obvious candidate being Conrad of Montferrat, who also had some claim as Baldwin V's paternal uncle. Balian and Maria seized Isabella and talked her into agreeing to a divorce. There were precedents: the annulment of Amalric I's marriage to Agnes of Courtenay, and the unsuccessful attempts to force Sibylla to divorce Guy.

Isabella's marriage was annulled by Ubaldo Lanfranchi, Archbishop of Pisa, who was Papal legate, and Philip of Dreux, Bishop of Beauvais. The Bishop of Beauvais then married her to Conrad (controversially, since his brother had been married to her half-sister and it was uncertain whether he had been divorced by his Byzantine wife). The succession dispute was prolonged by the arrival of Richard I of England and Philip II of France on the Third Crusade: Richard supported Guy, as a Poitevin vassal, while Philip supported Conrad, his late father's cousin.

Balian and Maria's role in Isabella's divorce and their support for Conrad as king earned them the bitter hatred of Richard and his supporters. Ambroise, who wrote a poetic account of the crusade, called Balian "more false than a goblin" and said he "should be hunted with dogs". The anonymous author of the Itinerarium Peregrinorum et Gesta Regis Ricardi wrote that Balian was a member of a "council of consummate iniquity" around Conrad, accused him of taking Conrad's bribes, and said of Maria and Balian as a couple:
Steeped in Greek filth from the cradle, she had a husband whose morals matched her own: he was cruel, she was godless; he was fickle, she was pliable; he was faithless, she was fraudulent.

On 28 April 1192, only days after his kingship was confirmed by election, Conrad was assassinated in Tyre. It is said that one of the two assassins responsible had entered Balian's household in Tyre some months previously, pretending to be a servant, in order to stalk his victim; the other may have similarly infiltrated Reginald of Sidon's or Conrad's own household. Richard was widely suspected of involvement in the murder. Isabella, who was expecting her first child (Maria of Montferrat), married Henry II of Champagne only a week later.

Balian became one of Henry's advisors, and later that year (along with William of Tiberias), he commanded the rearguard of Richard's army at the Battle of Jaffa of 1192. Later, he helped negotiate the Treaty of Jaffa in 1192 between Richard and Saladin, essentially ending the crusade. Under this treaty, Ibelin remained under Saladin's control, but many sites along the coast which had been reconquered during the crusade were allowed to remain in Christian hands. After Richard departed, Saladin compensated Balian with the castle of Caymont and five other nearby sites, all outside Acre.

Legacy 
Balian died in 1193, in his early fifties. With Maria Komnene he had four children:
 Helvis of Ibelin, who married (1) Reginald of Sidon; (2) Guy of Montfort.
 John of Ibelin, Lord of Beirut and constable of Jerusalem, and regent for his niece Maria of Montferrat, Queen of Jerusalem. He married (1) Helvis of Nephin; (2) Melisende of Arsuf.
 Margaret, who married (1) Hugh II of Saint Omer (stepson of Raymond III of Tripoli); (2) Walter III of Cæsarea.
 Philip of Ibelin, Regent of Cyprus, who married Alice of Montbéliard, and sired John of Ibelin, Count of Jaffa and Ascalon

Balian's squire Ernoul, who was with him on the embassy to Tripoli in 1187, wrote parts of the Old French continuation of the Latin chronicle of William of Tyre (William had died in 1186, before the fall of Jerusalem). Although this family of manuscripts now often bears his name, his account survives in only fragments within it, mainly for the period 1186–88, with a heavy bias in favour of the Ibelin family.

Balian became a common name in the Ibelin family in the 13th century. Balian, lord of Beirut, son of John and grandson of the above Balian, succeeded his father as lord of Beirut in 1236. Balian of Beirut's brother, also named John, had a son named Balian; this Balian was lord of Arsuf and married Plaisance of Antioch.

The name also passed into the family of the Greniers of Sidon, since Balian's daughter Helvis and Reginald of Sidon named their son Balian.

In popular culture

A fictionalized version of Balian, played by English actor Orlando Bloom, is the protagonist of Ridley Scott's 2005 film Kingdom of Heaven.

References

Sources
De Expugnatione Terrae Sanctae per Saladinum, translated by James A. Brundage, in The Crusades: A Documentary Survey. Marquette University Press, 1962.
William of Tyre, A History of Deeds Done Beyond the Sea. E. A. Babcock and A. C. Krey, trans. Columbia University Press, 1943.
Chronique d'Ernoul et de Bernard le Trésorier, edited by M. L. de Mas Latrie. La Société de l'Histoire de France, 1871.
La Continuation de Guillaume de Tyr (1184–1192), edited by Margaret Ruth Morgan. L'Académie des Inscriptions et Belles-Lettres, 1982.
Ambroise, The History of the Holy War, translated by Marianne Ailes. Boydell Press, 2003.
Chronicle of the Third Crusade, a Translation of Itinerarium Peregrinorum et Gesta Regis Ricardi, translated by Helen J. Nicholson. Ashgate, 1997.
, The Conquest of Jerusalem and the Third Crusade: Sources in Translation. Ashgate, 1996.
Peter W. Edbury, John of Ibelin and the Kingdom of Jerusalem. Boydell Press, 1997.
Amin Maalouf, The Crusades Through Arab Eyes. London, 1984.
H. E. Mayer, "Carving Up Crusaders: The Early Ibelins and Ramlas", in Outremer: Studies in the history of the Crusading Kingdom of Jerusalem presented to Joshua Prawer. Yad Izhak Ben-Zvi Institute, 1982.

1140s births
1193 deaths
Christians of the Third Crusade
House of Ibelin
Lords of Ramla
12th-century French people